Barani Institute of Information Technology (BIIT) was established at the Pir Mehr Ali Shah Arid Agriculture University  and is located in Rawalpindi, Punjab, Pakistan The institute is a self-financed/ self-funded project and was established as a partnership venture between the Pir Mehr Ali Shah Arid Agriculture University and Resource Organizers and Software Engineers (ROSE) International.

Academic programs

Bachelor of Computer Science BS(CS)

Bachelor of Information Technology BS(IT)

Bachelor of Science in Artificial Intelligence BS(AI)

Bachelor of Software Engineering BS(SE)

Achievements
 BIIT is the pioneer of 4 years degree programs and introduced it in Pakistan, in 1998.
 BIIT established Rawalpindi's first Software Technology Park in 2006.
 BIIT is first campus of PMAS, Arid Agriculture University which started IT program.
 BIIT was announced winner of "Best Mechanical Design Robot" award in the National Engineering Robotics Contest 2006 held in National University of Sciences and Technology. 
 BIIT was selected for SAF Games. 
 Students of BIIT were awarded 2nd position in Excite Cup 2013, held at Mohammad Ali Jinnah University, Islamabad. 
 Students of BIIT won 1st position in Mobile App Development and 2nd position in CS  Quiz Competition at NASCON FAST, 2014.
 A student won 1st position in Location Quest Space App Development 2014.

References

Universities and colleges in Rawalpindi District